Aliti is a village in Ancuabe District in Cabo Delgado Province in northeastern Mozambique.

Nearby towns and villages include Chefe Purulia, Chefe Muatuca, Namatuca, Moja, Nancuto and Palovi.

References

External links
Satellite map at Maplandia.com

Populated places in Ancuabe District